Stormtropis is a genus of Colombian baldlegged spiders first described by C. Perafán, W. Galvis & Fernando Pérez-Miles in 2019. The genus name is in reference to the fictional stormtroopers of the Star Wars franchise.

Species
 it contains four species:
Stormtropis colima Perafán, Galvis & Pérez-Miles, 2019 — Colombia
Stormtropis muisca Perafán, Galvis & Pérez-Miles, 2019 — Colombia
Stormtropis paisa Perafán, Galvis & Pérez-Miles, 2019 — Colombia
Stormtropis parvum Perafán, Galvis & Pérez-Miles, 2019 — Colombia

References

External links

Mygalomorphae genera
Paratropididae
Spiders of South America
Endemic fauna of Colombia
Arthropods of Colombia